Diego Joaquín País  (born 6 July 1976) is an Argentine football player.

Career
País began playing as a striker in his home country, but has spent most of his career in the lower divisions of Italian football and in the Costa Rican Primera División. In Costa Rica, he has played for Pérez Zeledón, Cartaginés, San Carlos and Herediano. He has scored a hat-trick with Pérez Zeledón and Cartaginés.

País signed with Carmelita in January 2013.

References

External links
Profile at BDFA

1976 births
Living people
Argentine footballers
Argentine expatriate footballers
Mantova 1911 players
Municipal Pérez Zeledón footballers
C.S. Cartaginés players
C.S. Herediano footballers
A.D. Carmelita footballers
Sportspeople from Bahía Blanca
Expatriate footballers in Italy
Expatriate footballers in Costa Rica
Bella Vista de Bahía Blanca footballers
Association football forwards